The 1928 United States presidential election in Florida was held on November 6, 1928, as part of the 1928 United States presidential election held throughout all contemporary forty-eight states. Florida voters chose six electors, or representatives to the Electoral College, who voted for president and vice president.

Background
Ever since the disfranchisement of blacks at the beginning of the 1890s, Florida had been a one-party state ruled by the Democratic Party. The disfranchisement of blacks and poor whites by poll taxes in 1889 had left the Republican Party – between 1872 and 1888 dependent upon black votes – virtually extinct.

With the single exception of William Howard Taft's win in Calhoun County in 1908 the Democratic Party won every county in Florida in every presidential election from 1892 until 1916. Only twice – and never for more than one term – did any Republican serve in either house of the state legislature between 1896 and 1928. Despite this Democratic dominance and the restrictions on the franchise of the poorer classes due to the poll tax, significant socialist movements were to develop and persist in Tampa and to a lesser extent over other parts of the state, especially against the powerful Ku Klux Klan. There was also a powerful Prohibitionist movement in older North Florida, which saw the Prohibition Party even win the governorship for one term under the notorious anti-Catholic minister Sidney J. Catts, who was later to be a major foe of Alfred Emmanuel Smith.

The 1920 presidential election saw Warren Harding, aided substantially by isolationist sentiment in the region, gain more support in the former Confederacy than any Republican since black disfranchisement, in the process winning three Florida counties. Calvin Coolidge in 1924 was to do no more than maintain these gains, but did show that the presidential GOP vote from transplanted Northerners was equal to or greater than the traditional Unionist GOP vote (which Florida entirely lacked) of Texas, Arkansas, Alabama or Georgia.

Anti-Catholic and Prohibitionist fear
With all other prominent Democrats sitting the election out, the party nominated Alfred E. Smith, four-term Governor of New York as its nominee for 1928, with little opposition. There was nonetheless almost no pro-Smith sympathy in Florida, which as part of the "Solid South" had been a major force in his 1924 defeat. This defeat was related to four characteristics of Smith that made him anything but an ideal candidate for Southern Democrats: he was a devout Catholic, opposed to Prohibition, linked with New York City's Tammany Hall political machine, and the son of Irish and Italian immigrants. His Wall Street connections also had Smith viewed by poorer Southern whites as a "Gold Democrat". Whilst it is generally thought that the South would have accepted a man possessing one of those characteristics, the combination proved a bitter dose for many of Florida's loyal Democrats. Many Florida Protestants believed Smith's election would endanger religious liberty and lead to the Pope controlling the White House.

More critically, the Southern Baptist Convention similarly said that 

Much of this anti-Smith political program was led by the Jacksonville Baptist Association, joined by the Indian River Missionary Baptist Association, Seminole Baptist Association, Peace River Baptist Association, Alachua Baptist Association, and the Florida Baptist Association in issuing similar resolutions at their 1928 annual meetings. The Methodist Episcopal Church took the same viewpoint, and it was Bishop James Cannon who stood behind militant "drys" to organize the "Anti-Smith Democrats" in Asheville, North Carolina, pledging to keep the country dry against Smith's support of modifying the Volstead Act.

The leader of the defense of Smith was Senator Duncan Upshaw Fletcher who argued that Smith was a "throroughgoing Democrat" and that the Republican Party was the party who had, in typical "Solid South" style, denounced the Southern people as rebels and traitors.

Echoing this, several Florida judges said it would be better to have a Catholic with some religion in the White House than a Republican with none. Smith's strongest supporter, Chief Justice William H. Ellis, also argued that the GOP was hypocritical in its support for Prohibition, and that because religious tests for elective office were forbidden by the Constitution, Smith would be unable to fill these offices with only Catholics. For Ellis, the election of Smith was the only way the Democratic Party could maintain itself. The Suwanee Democrat indeed argued that Hoover's Quaker faith meant he could not be elected President because it believed that Hoover's religious would not permit him to fight for his country and commanded racial equality in a state whose electorate was all-white.

Polls
During the months between the beginning of the campaign and the actual vote, a number of newspapers – including the Orlando Sentinel and the St. Petersburg Times – utilized voting machines to take a sample ballot. All these polls, in spite of the fact that the newspapers in question favored Smith, gave large majorities to Hoover, in the case of the Times by over two-to-one. Despite these polls, Smith campaigners took a long time to realize the danger that he would not carry the traditional "Solid South".

Vote
After a heated campaign in which he had played little part, Herbert Hoover won Florida against Al Smith by 42,404 votes or by a margin of 16.71 percentage points. Vis-à-vis the 1924 election, swings of up to 100 percentage points occurred in the western Panhandle pineywoods, where opposition to Smith's Catholic religion reached the fanatical, and Hoover also gained from increased Republican voting by northern migrants in Miami, Tampa, Fort Lauderdale, Sarasota and Jacksonville, along with the growth of an urban middle class in those cities. The 1928 US presidential election would be the first time that Florida would become a crucial bellwether state in presidential elections: from 1928 and on, the winner of the presidential election has carried the state in every election except in 1960, in 1992, and in 2020.

In contrast, the counties of the central and eastern Panhandle remained loyal to Smith, who still carried ten counties in this region, all over thirty-five percent nonvoting African-American, by three-to-one or larger majorities, because they saw party regularity as essential to preserving white supremacy against the Negro. However, unlike Alabama and Georgia, Florida lacked the strength to counter anti-Catholic voting – which was indeed stronger than in most other parts of the white South – with the result that Hoover gained his largest margin among the five Confederate states he carried.

Results

Results by county

Notes

References

Florida
1928 Florida elections
1928